Cuba is scheduled to compete at the 2017 World Aquatics Championships in Budapest, Hungary from 14 July to 30 July.

Diving

Cuba has entered 6 divers (four male and two female).

Men

Women

Mixed

Swimming

Cuban swimmers have achieved qualifying standards in the following events (up to a maximum of 2 swimmers in each event at the A-standard entry time, and 1 at the B-standard):

Synchronized swimming

Cuba's synchronized swimming team consisted of 4 athletes (4 female).

Women

References

Nations at the 2017 World Aquatics Championships
2017
World Aquatics Championships